Rumsey Hall School is an independent, coed junior boarding (5 - 9) and day (Pre K - 9) school in Washington, Connecticut. Rumsey Hall enrolls 309 students, and the campus consists of 32 buildings located on 231 acres along the scenic Bantam River in the Litchfield Hills region.

History
Founded in 1900 by Lillias Rumsey Sanford (1850–1940) as an all-boys school in Seneca Falls, New York, Rumsey Hall School moved to Cornwall, Connecticut in 1906. In 1941, the school passed into the hands of John F. Schereschewsky Sr. Rumsey Hall moved to its current location in 1949, at which point it became coeducational.  in 1943 John F. Schereschewsky Sr. left Rumsey Hall to join the Navy for two years. During this time, David Griffin Barr, a devoted faculty member since 1914, was appointed interim Director of Rumsey Hall. He led Rumsey Hall until Mr. Sherry returned. Mr. Barr remained as Headmaster until 1956 and John F. Schereschewsky Sr. acted as Director until his death in 1969. John F. Schereschewsky, Jr. served as Headmaster from 1965-1969 and as Director from 1969–1977. Louis Magnoli, a faculty member since 1957, became Headmaster in 1969 and served until 1985. Thomas Farmen, a faculty member since 1974, began as Headmaster in 1985 until 2016. Alumnus Matthew S. Hoeniger '81 was appointed eighth Headmaster in 2016. On July 1, 2021 Rumsey Hall School welcomed its tenth Head of School, Ian Craig, into office.

Facilities 
The physical plant includes 32 buildings on 147-acres along the Bantam River. The campus includes Upper and Lower School Academic Buildings, Fine Arts Building, Performing Arts Center, nine dormitories, seven athletic fields, two gymnasiums, hockey rink, as well as three indoor and three outdoor tennis courts and a newly constructed Dining Hall/Campus Center and Health Center.

References

External links

Official website
The Association of Boarding Schools profile

Boarding schools in Connecticut
Private elementary schools in Connecticut
Washington, Connecticut
Schools in Litchfield County, Connecticut
School buildings on the National Register of Historic Places in Connecticut
Educational institutions established in 1900
1900 establishments in New York (state)
National Register of Historic Places in Litchfield County, Connecticut